Li (lǐ, or , shìlǐ), also known as the Chinese mile , is a traditional Chinese unit of distance. The li has varied considerably over time but was usually about one third of an English mile and now has a standardized length of a half-kilometer. This is then divided into 1,500 chi or "Chinese feet".

The character 里 combines the characters for "field" (田, tián) and "earth" (土, tǔ), since it was considered to be about the length of a single village. As late as the 1940s, a "li" did not represent a fixed measure but could be longer or shorter depending on the effort required to cover the distance.

There is also another li (Traditional: 釐, Simplified: 厘, lí) that indicates a unit of length  of a chi, but it is used much less commonly. This li is used in the People's Republic of China as the equivalent of the centi- prefix in metric units, thus limi (厘米, límǐ) for centimeter. The tonal difference makes it distinguishable to speakers of Chinese, but unless specifically noted otherwise, any reference to li will always refer to the longer traditional unit and not to either the shorter unit or the kilometer. This traditional unit, in terms of historical usage and distance proportion, can be considered the East Asian counterpart to the Western league unit. However, English league commonly means "3 miles". Based upon the etymology of English mile from Latin mīlle ("1,000") abbreviating mīlle passūs ("1,000 paces"), Victor Mair coined the neologism "tricent" ("300 [paces], about a third of a mile") to translate li as a unit of distance.

Changing values

Like most traditional Chinese measurements, the li was reputed to have been established by the Yellow Emperor at the founding of Chinese civilization around 2600 BC and standardized by Yu the Great of the Xia Dynasty six hundred years later. Although the value varied from state to state during the Spring and Autumn period and Warring States periods, historians give a general value to the li of 405 meters prior to the Qin Dynasty imposition of its standard in the 3rd century BC.

The basic Chinese traditional unit of distance was the chi. As its value changed over time, so did the lis. In addition, the number of chi per li was sometimes altered. Thus, the Qin li of about 576 meters became (with other changes) the Han li, which was standardized at 415.8 meters.

The basic units of measurement remained stable over the Qin and Han periods. A bronze imperial standard measure, dated AD 9, had been preserved at the Imperial Palace in Beijing and came to light in 1924. This has allowed very accurate conversions to modern measurements, which has provided a new and extremely useful additional tool in the identification of place names and routes. These measurements have been confirmed in many ways including the discovery of a number of rulers found at archaeological sites, and careful measurements of distances between known points. The Han li was calculated by Dubs to be 415.8 metres and all indications are that this is a precise and reliable determination.

Under the Tang Dynasty (AD 618–907), the li was approximately 323 meters.

In the late Manchu or Qing Dynasty, the number of chi was increased from 1,500 per li to 1,800. This had a value of 2115 feet or 644.6 meters. In addition, the Qing added a longer unit called the tu, which was equal to 150 li (96.7 km).

These changes were undone by the Republic of China of Chiang Kai-shek, who adopted the metric system in 1928. The Republic of China (now also known as Taiwan) continues not to use the li at all but only the kilometer (Mandarin: , gōnglǐ, lit. "common li").

Under Mao Zedong, the People's Republic of China reinstituted the traditional units as a measure of anti-imperialism and cultural pride before officially adopting the metric system in 1984. A place was made within this for the traditional units, which were restandardized to metric values. A modern li is thus set at exactly half a kilometer (500 meters). However, unlike the jin which is still frequently preferred in daily use over the kilogram, the li is almost never used. Nonetheless, its appearance in many phrases and sayings means that "kilometer" must always be specified by saying gōnglǐ in full.

Cultural use

As one might expect for the equivalent of "mile", li appears in many Chinese sayings, locations, and proverbs as an indicator of great distances or the exotic:

 One Chinese name for the Great Wall is the "Ten-Thousand-Li Long Wall". As in Greek, the number "ten thousand" is used figuratively in Chinese to mean any "immeasurable" value and this title has never provided a literal distance of 10,000 li. The actual length of the modern Great Wall is around 42,000 li, over 4 times the name's proverbially "immeasurable" length.
 The Chinese proverb appearing in chapter 64 of the Tao Te Ching and commonly rendered as "A journey of a thousand miles begins with a single step" in fact refers to a thousand li: 千里之行，始於足下 (Qiānlǐzhīxíng, shǐyúzúxià).
 The greatest horses of Chinese history  including Red Hare and Hualiu (驊騮)  are all referred to as "thousand-li horses" (qiānlǐmǎ), since they could supposedly travel a thousand li in a single day.
 Li is sometimes used in location names, for example: Wulipu (Chinese: 五里铺镇), Hubei; Ankang Wulipu Airport (Chinese: 安康五里铺机场), Shaanxi. Sanlitun is an area in Beijing.

Ri in Japan and Korea

The present day Korean ri (리, 里) and Japanese ri (里) are units of measurements that can be traced back to the Chinese li (里).

Although the Chinese unit was unofficially used in Japan since the Zhou Dynasty, the countries officially adopted the measurement used by the Tang Dynasty (618–907 AD). The ri of an earlier era in Japan was thus true to Chinese length, corresponding to six chō ( 500–600 m), but later evolved to denote the distance that a person carrying a load would aim to cover on mountain roads in one hour. Thus, there had been various ri of 36, 40, and 48 chō. In the Edo period, the Tokugawa shogunate defined 1 ri as 36 chō, allowing other variants, and the Japanese government adopted this last definition in 1891. The Japanese ri was, at that time, fixed to the metric system,  ≈ 3.93 kilometres or about 2.44 miles. Therefore, one must be careful about the correspondence between chō and ri. See Kujūkuri Beach (99-ri beach) for a case.

In South Korea, the ri currently in use is a unit taken from the Han dynasty (206 BC–220 AD) li. It has a value of approximately 392.72 meters, or one tenth of the ri. The Aegukga, the national anthem of South Korea, and the Aegukka, the national anthem of North Korea, both mention 3,000 ri, which roughly corresponds to 1,200 km, the approximate longitudal span of the Korean peninsula.

In North Korea the Chollima Movement, a campaign aimed at improving labour productivity along the lines of the earlier Soviet Stakhanovite movement, gets its name from the word "chollima" which refers to a thousand-ri horse (chŏn + ri + ma in North Korean Romanization).

See also
 Chinese units of measurement
 League (unit) for a general discussion of league-style units
 Japanese units of measurement
 Korean units of measurement
 Qianlima for more on  "thousand-li horse" including North Korean Chollima

References

Citations

Sources 
 Homer H. Dubs (1938): The History of the Former Han Dynasty by Pan Ku. Vol. One. Translator and editor: Homer H. Dubs. Baltimore. Waverly Press, Inc.
 Homer H. Dubs (1955): The History of the Former Han Dynasty by Pan Ku. Vol. Three. Translator and editor: Homer H. Dubs. Ithaca, New York. Spoken Languages Services, Inc.
 Hulsewé, A. F. P. (1961). "Han measures". A. F. P. Hulsewé, T'oung pao Archives, Vol. XLIX, Livre 3, pp. 206–207.
 Needham, Joseph. (1986). Science and Civilization in China: Volume 4, Physics and Physical Technology, Part 3, Civil Engineering and Nautics. Taipei: Caves Books Ltd.

External links
Chinese Imperial Distance converter from Convert Me

History of science and technology in China
Units of length